Zora Vesecká (born 3 March 1967) is a Czech actress. Rising to national attention as a child actor, she gave up on her acting career, eventually becoming a dentist.

Selected filmography
Neohlížej se, jde za námi kůň (1979)
Brontosaurus (1979)
Muž přes palubu (1980)
Drž se rovně, Kačenko  (1981)

References

External links

1967 births
Living people
Czechoslovak film actresses
Actors from Olomouc
20th-century Czech actresses
Czech dentists
Czech child actresses